Micromitrium is a genus of haplolepideous mosses (Dicranidae) in the monotypic family Micromitriaceae . The genus Micrometrium was previously placed in family Pottiaceae in order Pottiales.

Species

The genus contains the following species:

Micromitrium brisbanicum 
Micromitrium lacustre 
Micromitrium megalosporum 
Micromitrium neocaledonicum 
Micromitrium perexiguum 
Micromitrium subaequinoctale 
Micromitrium synoicum 
Micromitrium tenerum 
Micromitrium thelephorothecum 
Micromitrium wrightii

References

Moss genera
Dicranales